Guy Millar (born 23 April 1992) is an Australian rugby union footballer who plays as a prop for the French club Biarritz Olympique. He previously played for the Dunedin-based  and Western Force teams in the Super Rugby competition.

Family and early life
Millar was born in Cape Town, South Africa. When he was 14 years old, he moved with his parents to Australia where he attended The Kings School in Sydney. He played for the Australian Schoolboys rugby team in 2010.

He has been dating Lauren Ryan since 2011.

Career
Millar played club rugby for Sydney University and was invited into the NSW Waratahs Academy in 2011 before joining the ARU's national academy for the 2012 and 2013 seasons. In 2014 he switched to play for Eastwood and was a member of the club's Shute Shield premiership-winning side.

Millar signed with the Greater Sydney Rams later in 2014 year to play in the inaugural season of the National Rugby Championship.

Super Rugby statistics

References

1992 births
Living people
Rugby union props
Western Force players
Australian rugby union players
South African emigrants to Australia
Greater Sydney Rams players
Southland rugby union players
Rugby union players from Cape Town